Kunturi (Aymara for condor, Hispanicized spelling Condori) is a mountain in the Cusco Region in the Andes of Peru, about  high. It is situated in the Espinar Province, Condoroma District. Kunturi lies south-east of Condoroma and the mountain Yanaqaqa (Yanacaca) and north of the mountain Pilluni (Pillone).

References 

Mountains of Peru
Mountains of Cusco Region